Hanna Mina (9 March 1924 – 21 August 2018) was a Syrian novelist, described in Literature from the "Axis of Evil" as the country's "most prominent".

His early novels belong to the movement of social realism, and focus on class conflict; his later works contain "a more symbolic analysis of class differences". His writing on the suffering of ordinary people was partly inspired by his own experiences, alternately working as a stevedore, barber and journalist; his autobiographical short story, "On the Sacks", was published in 1976.

Several of his works are set during the period of the French Mandate of Syria, or in the period immediately following independence.

Mina has authored about 40 novels, varying in imaginary value and narrative significance. But his achievement lies in the foundation he laid for this literary structure. For his collective works and novels, Mina was awarded the Arab Writer's Prize in 2005.

Early life
Born to a Christian Arab family in Latakia in 1924, Hanna Mina spent his childhood in one of the villages near Iskenderun, but following the entrance of the Turkish forces to the district (Hatay State), he moved back to Latakia with his family. Although with only an elementary school certificate, Mina used to write letters and petitions to the government on behalf of illiterates, and distributed the Communist Sawt al-Shaab (Voice of the People) newspaper alongside working as a barber.

Writing
In 1947, he moved to Beirut in search for a job, later moving to Damascus where he began his literary career.

In the 1950s, Mina joined the Damascus newspaper al-Inshaa as a trainee editor. He was paid a monthly salary of a mere 100 Syrian pounds and lived in relative poverty.

He wrote several short stories, which brought him into literary circles, and he co-founded the Syrian Writers Federation in 1951 and later moved to become the editor in-chief of al-Inshaa. His first novel was 1954's The Blue Lanterns. Although slowly gaining fame and prestige and becoming of Syria's renowned writers, he never stopped reflecting on the harsh reality of his earlier life, which he considered as fuel for his novels. He has said that "reality carves its inscriptions on human skin with a hot iron that leaves permanent marks and scars".

His novel, The Swamp, which invoked fragments of Mina's childhood in Iskenderun, was described by literary critic Salah Fadl as “the greatest autobiography in Arab novel-writing, and the most abundant in brutal honesty and wealth of thought." Mina's 1989 novel The End of a Brave Man (Nihayat Rajul Shujaa) was adapted into a 1994 television miniseries of the same name.

Death
Mina died on 21 August 2018 in Damascus, aged 94.

Legacy
In Syria, the Culture Ministry annually awards the Hanna Mina Prize for Literature.

See also 

 Sail and storm
 White Ebony

Notes

1924 births
2018 deaths
People from Latakia
Syrian novelists
Syrian journalists